Daniel Cuevas Granados (born July 23, 1993) is an American former professional soccer player who played as a winger.

Club career

Cuevas came through Santos Laguna's academy, but never progressed past the U-20 level.  In 2013, he moved to Ascenso MX club Lobos BUAP.  He made his professional debut in a Copa MX match against Veracruz.

International career

Born in the United States and of Mexican descent, Cuevas was a member of the United States U-20 team during the 2013 CONCACAF U-20 Championship and the 2013 FIFA U-20 World Cup.

References

1993 births
Living people
American soccer players
Association football midfielders
American sportspeople of Mexican descent
American expatriate soccer players
Expatriate footballers in Mexico
American expatriate sportspeople in Mexico
Santos Laguna footballers
Lobos BUAP footballers
Indy Eleven players
United States men's under-20 international soccer players
United States men's under-23 international soccer players
Soccer players from Sacramento, California
North American Soccer League players
Sacramento Gold FC players
National Premier Soccer League players